João Corso, S.D.B. (March 30, 1928 – October 15, 2014) was a Brazilian salesian who led the Diocese of Campos from 1990 to 1995.

Ordained to the priesthood August 30, 1953, he was named bishop of the Roman Catholic Diocese of Campos, Brazil on October 12, 1990, and was ordained bishop on December 8, 1990. He resigned on November 22, 1995.

Notes

External links
Profile of Mons. Corso www.catholic-hierarchy.org

1928 births
2014 deaths
20th-century Roman Catholic bishops in Brazil
Salesian bishops
Roman Catholic bishops of Campos